North Point Estate was a public housing estate at the harbour front of North Point, Hong Kong near North Point Ferry Pier and its bus terminus, approaching Victoria Harbour. It was the largest public housing estate in the Eastern District. It was the second public housing estate built by the Hong Kong Housing Authority and enjoyed a reputation as one of the most impressive construction schemes in Asia and as a public housing estate in one of the most "luxurious" areas on Hong Kong Island.

History
North Point Estate was developed by the Hong Kong Housing Authority and completed in 1957. It comprised seven 11-storey blocks with a total of 1,956 flats. Although North Point Estate was structurally safe, the Housing Authority decided to redevelop the estate due to increasing maintenance problems and costs. The estate was cleared in 2002 and demolished in 2003. Its tenants were rehoused to new units on the Oi Tung Estate at Aldrich Bay, Shau Kei Wan and Hing Wah Estate at Chai Wan.

North Point had a mass population and many people who live in Hong Kong know about the thriving estate.

The site today
On 2 March 2000, the Housing Authority announced the redevelopment of North Point Estate by February 2002. Upon completion of rehousing, the site will be redeveloped after comprehensive planning. This is in line with the Long Term Housing Strategy (LTHS) published in 1998 on the redevelopment of older housing estates on a need basis. Under the Authority's Comprehensive Redevelopment Programme (CRP), 566 housing blocks in 57 estates will be redeveloped by 2005. At the moment, we already demolished over 400 buildings to improve the living conditions of the residents.

After North Point Estate was demolished, the east and central part of the site were used as temporary open car parks and the rest left vacant, for more than ten years. In 2007, the Housing Authority decided to return the site to the government for redevelopment.

From 2017 to 2019, the site was redeveloped. The eastern section became private housing, with a new bus terminus at ground level, while the western section is occupied by Hotel Vic.

References

North Point
Former public housing estates in Hong Kong
Residential buildings completed in 1957
Buildings and structures demolished in 2003
2003 disestablishments in Hong Kong